Facehugger may refer to:

 Facehugger, a parasitic bat fly of the genus Penicillidia
 Facehugger, a fictional parasitoid in the Alien franchise